Clayton Wellington Gonçalves dos Santos (born January 2, 1983, in São José do Rio Preto), better known as Branquinho, is a Brazilian professional football player who plays as an offensive midfielder, currently playing for Sao José EC in Campeonato Paulistão A3 division.

Club career
(Correct )

Transfers and loans 

(Information regarding the transfers and loans of the player before 2015 are not available or not verifiable)

Palmarés 

 2010 Runner-up team (EC Santo André) in Campeonato Paulista Série A1
 2011 Runner-up team (Atlético Paranaense) in Campeonato Paranaense
 2014 Winner team (EC Bahia) in Campeonato Baiano 1
 2016 Winner team (EC Santo André) in Campeonato Paulista Série A2

References

External links

People from São José do Rio Preto
1983 births
Living people
Brazilian footballers
Brazilian expatriate footballers
Expatriate footballers in Japan
Brazilian expatriate sportspeople in Japan
Campeonato Brasileiro Série A players
Campeonato Brasileiro Série B players
J1 League players
J2 League players
Rio Preto Esporte Clube players
Botafogo Futebol Clube (SP) players
Grêmio Barueri Futebol players
Ceará Sporting Club players
Esporte Clube Santo André players
Club Athletico Paranaense players
Esporte Clube Bahia players
Oeste Futebol Clube players
Cerezo Osaka players
Montedio Yamagata players
Red Bull Brasil players
Association football midfielders
Footballers from São Paulo (state)